The I3 Ventures case, also known as Barçagate or Bartogate, was an alleged defamation campaign of FC Barcelona on social media uncovered on 17 February 2020 by journalists Adrià Soldevila and Sergi Escudero of the program Què T'hi Jugues of Cadena SER. This defamation campaign would consist of hiring a company called I3Ventures.sl to create states of opinion on social media, through dozens of "unofficial" accounts of the club that would be dedicated to protecting the image of Josep Maria Bartomeu (president of the club at that time) and at the same time also attacking people from different areas of the Barça environment. Among the objective profiles of the defamation campaign would be then players such as Lionel Messi or Gerard Piqué, former players such as Xavi, Carles Puyol and Pep Guardiola, and also local figures such as Víctor Font (pre-candidate for the presidency of the club), Joan Laporta, Jaume Roures, as well as profiles of pro-independence organizations and even political figures such as Quim Torra and Carles Puigdemont, Òmnium Cultural, the Assemblea Nacional Catalana, and the Democratic Tsunami.

At first, Barça's board of directors denied having hired I3 Ventures for any social media campaign to improve the board's own image and attack other profiles. On the day of the publication of the case, however, the club's own president Bartomeu announced that they would terminate the contract with I3 Ventures. Contract that he acknowledged that they had maintained since 2017 and that according to his statements was intended to monitor the information that was published about the club on social media.

On 1 March 2021, Catalan police raided club's offices in a search and seizure operation; in addition, Bartomeu, his adviser Jaume Masferrer, CEO Oscar Grau and head of legal services Roman Gomez Bonti were arrested. Bartomeu admitted that he hired I3 Ventures to improve Barcelona's image on social media, but denied that he intended to damage the reputation of individuals. The social media company had earned 980,000 euro for the campaign. On the same day, FC Barcelona had released a statement in which they declared that the information and documentation requested by the judicial police force related only to the case of "contacting of monitoring services on social networks".

Negreira case 
On 15 February 2023, a new scandal, also dubbed Barçagate by the public and the media, surfaced along with an investigation named the Negreira case, in which, allegedly, the club made payments to a company belonging to the then vice-president of the Referees Comittee (CTA), José María Enríquez Negreira. Two days later, new informations surfaced that showed a letter dated 5 February 2019, in which Negreira threatened to expose Barça's illegal activities in retaliation for the club finishing the contract with Negreira's firm, following a series of cost reductions.

References

FC Barcelona
Corruption in Spain
Association football controversies